Fortune Hunter is an American action-adventure drama series that was shown on Fox from September 4 to October 2, 1994, starring Mark Frankel as the super-spy Carlton Dial.

In the United States, Fortune Hunter aired on Fox from September 4, 1994 to October 2, 1994. Of the 13 episodes produced, only five were aired for the North American audience. The decision to schedule the series immediately after football on Sundays at 7:00 pm was a factor in the dismissal of Sandy Grushow, president of Fox Entertainment, by chairman Rupert Murdoch.

The show has aired in its entirety in other countries. It was well liked and generally received high ratings.

Plot
The series was a high paced, action and adventure based show that followed the exploits of Carlton Dial (Mark Frankel). Dial is an ex-government agent whose high-risk assignments take him to exotic locales and into extreme danger, all in the name of recovering some of the world's most sought-after items – classified information, complex weapons systems, and the occasional endangered species, which have fallen into the wrong hands – for a handsome fee.

Dial is now working as a master agent for the Intercept Corporation, a high-tech global recovery organization based in San Francisco. Dial and his partner, the affable Harry Flack (John Robert Hoffman) execute incredibly complex plans to retrieve these valuable items, depending on split-second timing and an astounding array of sophisticated electronic gadgetry.

Dial is portrayed as a suave, charming and self-assured spy, similar in style, dressing and witty remarks to James Bond, who uses his quick wit and sense of humor to get him out of many precarious situations. Dial performs his high-risk assignments with deadly seriousness. Determined to keep his perfect success record intact, he depends upon split-second timing and an astounding array of sophisticated electronic gadgetry – not to mention his partner, Harry. Dial wears a special contact lens with a built-in camera and an electronic earpiece, so Harry can see and hear everything that Dial does. This also allows Harry to speak with Dial, relaying information to the agent immediately, from the safety of the home office.

As Dial travels the globe, Harry shares dangerous missions with Dial while linked to him by computer. He is in charge of the technological end, seeing and hearing everything Dial sees and hears, and providing the information not readily available to the average person. But much is left to Harry's imagination as the details of Dial's private life remain – well, private.

The humor in their pairing is that each man believes that he is the one in charge. Dial is the agent with "the perfect recovery record," the one who is always in danger, while Flack, the technological wizard, sees himself as "the brains," and lives vicariously through his partner, which often can get Dial into trouble.

Cast
 Mark Frankel as Carlton Dial
 John Robert Hoffman as Harry Flack

Episodes

References

External links

1990s American drama television series
1994 American television series debuts
1994 American television series endings
Fox Broadcasting Company original programming
American adventure television series
English-language television shows
Television series by Sony Pictures Television